Denys Pavlyuk (born 15 January 1992) is a Ukrainian modern pentathlete. He is 2018 European bronze medalist in men's team competition.

References

External links

1992 births
Living people
Ukrainian male modern pentathletes
World Modern Pentathlon Championships medalists